In enzymology, a 2-oxoaldehyde dehydrogenase (NADP+) is an enzyme that catalyzes the chemical reaction

a 2-oxoaldehyde + NADP+ + H2O  a 2-oxo acid + NADPH + H+

The 3 substrates of this enzyme are 2-oxoaldehyde, NADP+, and H2O, whereas its 3 products are 2-oxo acid, NADPH, and H+.

This enzyme belongs to the family of oxidoreductases, specifically those acting on the aldehyde or oxo group of donor with NAD+ or NADP+ as acceptor.  The systematic name of this enzyme class is 2-oxoaldehyde:NADP+ 2-oxidoreductase. Other names in common use include alpha-ketoaldehyde dehydrogenase, methylglyoxal dehydrogenase, NADP+-linked alpha-ketoaldehyde dehydrogenase, 2-ketoaldehyde dehydrogenase, NADP+-dependent alpha-ketoaldehyde dehydrogenase, and 2-oxoaldehyde dehydrogenase (NADP+).  This enzyme participates in pyruvate metabolism.

References

 
 

EC 1.2.1
NADPH-dependent enzymes
Enzymes of unknown structure